Estrées is a commune in the Nord department in northern France.

It is one of many villages in the north of France bearing the name Estrées. The etymology of the name is from strata (cognate of English "street"), the word for the stone-layered Roman roads in the area (some of which turned into modern highways). Hence Estreti, village on the road which developed into Estrées.

Heraldry

See also
Communes of the Nord department

References

Communes of Nord (French department)
French Flanders